The 2009–10 Oregon State Beavers women's basketball team represented Oregon State University in the 2009–10 NCAA Division I basketball season. The Beavers were coached by LaVonda Wagner. The Beavers, a member of the Pacific-10 Conference, finished last in the conference and did not qualify for any national postseason tournament.

Offseason
https://archive.today/20130216150210/http://www.osubeavers.com/sports/w-gym/spec-rel/050709aaa.html
May 7:The 11th annual Bennys, a celebration to commemorate this year's achievements of student-athletes, is scheduled for Tues., June 2 at the LaSells Stewart Center (across from Reser Stadium).  The awards ceremony starts at 7 p.m..
May 18:Members of the Oregon State women's basketball team participated in the Relay For Life, an annual event held across the nation to benefit the American Cancer Society.

Regular season

Roster

Schedule

Player stats

Postseason

Pac-10 Basketball tournament
 See 2010 Pacific-10 Conference women's basketball tournament

NCAA Basketball tournament

Awards and honors

Team players drafted into the WNBA

References

External links
Official Site

Oregon State Beavers women's basketball seasons
Oregon State
Oregon State
Oregon State